James Orsen Bakker (born January 2, 1940) is an American televangelist. Between 1974 and 1987, Bakker hosted the television program The PTL Club and its cable television platform, the PTL Satellite Network, with his then wife, Tammy Faye. He also developed Heritage USA, a now-defunct Christian theme park in Fort Mill, South Carolina.

In the late 1980s, Bakker resigned from the PTL ministry over a cover-up of hush money to church secretary Jessica Hahn for an alleged rape. Subsequent revelations of accounting fraud brought about felony charges, conviction, imprisonment, and divorce. Bakker later remarried and returned to televangelism, founding Morningside Church in Blue Eye, Missouri, and reestablishing the PTL ministry. He currently hosts The Jim Bakker Show, which focuses on the end times and the Second Coming of Christ while promoting emergency survival products. Bakker has written several books, including I Was Wrong and Time Has Come: How to Prepare Now for Epic Events Ahead.

Personal life
James Orsen Bakker was born in Muskegon, Michigan, the son of Raleigh Bakker and Furnia Lynette "Furn" Irwin. Bakker attended North Central University, a Minneapolis bible college affiliated with the Assemblies of God, where he met fellow student Tammy Faye LaValley in 1960. Bakker worked at a restaurant in the Young-Quinlan department store in Minneapolis; Tammy Faye worked at the Three Sisters, a nearby boutique.

The Bakkers married on April 1, 1961, and left college to become itinerant evangelists. They had two children, Tammy Sue "Sissy" Bakker Chapman (born March 2, 1970) and Jamie Charles "Jay" Bakker (born December 18, 1975). The couple divorced on March 13, 1992. On September 4, 1998, Bakker married Lori Beth Graham, a former televangelist, fifty days after they met. In 2002, they adopted five children.

Career

Early career
In 1966, Jim and Tammy Faye Bakker began working at Pat Robertson's Christian Broadcasting Network (CBN) in Portsmouth, Virginia, which had an audience in the low thousands at the time. The Bakkers contributed to the network's growth, hosting a children's variety show called Come On Over that employed comic routines with puppets. Due to the success of Come On Over, Robertson made Bakker the host of a new prime-time talk show, The 700 Club, which gradually became CBN's flagship program. The Bakkers left CBN in 1972 and, the following year, joined with Paul and Jan Crouch to help co-found the Trinity Broadcasting Network (TBN) in California. However, this partnership lasted only eight months until a falling-out between Jim Bakker and Paul Crouch caused the Bakkers to leave the new network.

PTL

After their exit from TBN, the Bakkers moved to Charlotte, North Carolina, where in 1976 they debuted their own late night-style talk show, The PTL Club. Bakker founded the PTL Satellite Network in 1974, which aired The PTL Club and other religious television programs through local affiliates across the U.S.

Throughout the 1970s, Bakker built a headquarters for PTL in the Carolinas called Heritage Village. Over time, the Bakkers expanded the ministry to include the Heritage USA theme park in Fort Mill, South Carolina, which became the third most successful theme park in the U.S. at the time. Viewer contributions were estimated to exceed $1 million a week, with proceeds to expand the theme park and The PTL Club mission. Bakker responded to inquiries about his use of mass media by saying: "I believe that if Jesus were alive today, he would be on TV".

Two scandals brought down PTL in 1987: Bakker was accused of sexual misconduct by church secretary Jessica Hahn, which led to his resignation, and his illegal misuse of ministry funds eventually led to his imprisonment. Bakker was dismissed as an Assemblies of God minister on May 6, 1987. In 1990, the biographic television movie Fall from Grace, starring Kevin Spacey as Bakker, depicted his rise and fall. On January 18, 2019, ABC's 20/20 aired a two-hour special, entitled Unfaithfully Yours, about the PTL scandal.

Early investigations 
In 1979, Bakker and PTL came under investigation by the Federal Communications Commission (FCC) for allegedly misusing funds raised on the air. The FCC report was finalized in 1982 and found that Bakker had raised $350,000 that he told viewers would go towards funding overseas missions but that was actually used to pay for part of Heritage USA. The report also found that the Bakkers used PTL funds for personal expenses. FCC commissioners voted four to three to drop the investigation, after which they allowed Bakker to sell the only TV station that he owned, therefore bypassing future FCC oversight. The FCC forwarded its report to the U.S. Department of Justice, which declined to press charges, citing insufficient evidence. Bakker used the controversy to raise more funds from his audience, branding the investigation a "witch-hunt" and asking viewers to "give the Devil a black eye".

A confidential 1985 Internal Revenue Service (IRS) report found that $1.3 million in ministry funds was used for the Bakkers' personal benefit from 1980 to 1983. The report recommended that PTL be stripped of its tax-exempt status, but no action was taken until after the Jessica Hahn scandal broke in 1987. Art Harris and Michael Isikoff wrote in The Washington Post that politics may have played a role in the three government agencies taking no action against PTL despite the evidence against them, as members of the Reagan administration were not eager to go after television ministers whose evangelical followers made up their base.

Sexual misconduct and resignation
A $279,000 payoff for the silence of Jessica Hahn, who alleged that Bakker and former PTL Club co-host John Wesley Fletcher drugged and raped her, was paid with PTL funds through Bakker's associate Roe Messner. Bakker, who made PTL's financial decisions, allegedly kept two sets of books to conceal accounting irregularities. Reporters for The Charlotte Observer, led by Charles Shepard, investigated PTL's finances and published a series of articles.

On March 19, 1987, after the disclosure of a payoff to Hahn, Bakker resigned from PTL. Although he acknowledged that he had a sexual encounter with Hahn at a hotel room in Clearwater, Florida, he denied raping her. Bakker was also the subject of homosexual and bisexual allegations made by Fletcher and PTL director Jay Babcock, which Bakker denied under oath. Rival televangelist John Ankerberg appeared on Larry King Live and made several allegations of moral impropriety against Bakker, which both Bakkers denied.

Bakker was succeeded as PTL head by the Rev. Jerry Falwell of Thomas Road Baptist Church in Lynchburg, Virginia. Bakker chose Falwell as his successor because he feared that fellow televangelist Jimmy Swaggart, who had initiated an Assemblies of God investigation into Bakker's sexual misconduct, was attempting to take over his ministry.

Bakker believed that Falwell would temporarily lead the ministry until the scandal died down, but on April 28, 1987, Falwell barred Bakker from returning to PTL upon hearing of allegations of illicit behavior which went beyond the Hahn allegations. Later that summer, as donations declined sharply in the wake of Bakker's resignation and the end of The PTL Club, Falwell raised $20 million to keep Heritage USA solvent and took a promised water slide ride at the park. Falwell and the remaining members of the PTL board resigned in October 1987, stating that a ruling from a bankruptcy court judge made rebuilding the ministry impossible.

In response to the scandal, Falwell called Bakker a liar, an embezzler, a sexual deviant, and "the greatest scab and cancer on the face of Christianity in 2,000 years of church history". On CNN, Swaggart stated that Bakker was a "cancer in the body of Christ". In February 1988, Swaggart became involved in a sex scandal of his own after being caught visiting prostitutes in New Orleans. The Bakker and Swaggart scandals had a profound effect on the world of televangelism, causing greater media scrutiny of TV ministers and their finances. Falwell said that the scandals had "strengthened broadcast evangelism and made Christianity stronger, more mature and more committed." Joe Carter of The Gospel Coalition later compared the PTL scandal to the 2017 Harvey Weinstein sexual abuse allegations.

Fraud conviction and imprisonment
The PTL Clubs fundraising activities between 1984 and 1987 were reported by The Charlotte Observer, eventually leading to criminal charges against Bakker. Bakker and his PTL associates sold $1,000 "lifetime memberships", entitling buyers to an annual three-night stay at a luxury hotel at Heritage USA during that period. According to the prosecution at Bakker's fraud trial, tens of thousands of memberships were sold but only one 500-room hotel was ever finished. Bakker sold "exclusive partnerships" which exceeded capacity, raising more than twice the money needed to build the hotel. Much of the money paid Heritage USA's operating expenses, and Bakker kept $3.4 million.

After a 16-month federal grand jury probe, Bakker was indicted in 1988 on eight counts of mail fraud, 15 counts of wire fraud and one count of conspiracy. In 1989, after a five-week trial which began on August 28 in Charlotte, North Carolina, a jury found him guilty on all 24 counts. Judge Robert Daniel Potter sentenced Bakker to 45 years in federal prison and imposed a $500,000 fine. At the Federal Medical Center, Rochester in Rochester, Minnesota, he shared a cell with activist Lyndon LaRouche and skydiver Roger Nelson.

The United States Court of Appeals for the Fourth Circuit upheld Bakker's conviction on the fraud and conspiracy charges, voided Bakker's 45-year sentence and $500,000 fine and ordered a new sentencing hearing in February 1991. The court ruled that Potter's sentencing statement about Bakker, that "those of us who do have a religion are sick of being saps for money-grubbing preachers and priests", was evidence that the judge had injected his religious beliefs into Bakker's sentence.

A sentence-reduction hearing was held on November 16, 1992, and Bakker's sentence was reduced to eight years. In August 1993, he was transferred to a minimum-security federal prison in Jesup, Georgia. Bakker was paroled in July 1994, after serving almost five years of his sentence. His son, Jay, spearheaded a letter-writing campaign to the parole board advocating leniency. Celebrity lawyer Alan Dershowitz acted as Bakker's parole attorney, having said that he "would guarantee that Mr. Bakker would never again engage in the blend of religion and commerce that led to his conviction." Bakker was released from Federal Bureau of Prisons custody on December 1, 1994, owing $6 million to the IRS.

Return to televangelism

In 2003, Bakker began broadcasting The Jim Bakker Show daily at Studio City Café in Branson, Missouri, with his second wife Lori; it has been carried on CTN, Daystar, Folk TV, Grace Network (Canada), Daystar Television Canada, GEB America, Hope TV (Canada), Impact Network, WGN, WHT, TCT Network, The Word Network, UpliftTV, and ZLiving networks. Most of Bakker's audience receives his program on DirecTV and Dish Network. Bakker condemned the prosperity theology in which he took part earlier in his career, and has embraced apocalypticism. His show has a millennial, survivalist focus and sells buckets of freeze-dried food to his audience in preparation for the end of days. Elspeth Reeve wrote in The Atlantic that Bakker's "doomsday survival gear" is overpriced. A man named Jerry Crawford, who credits Bakker with saving his marriage, invested $25 million in a new ministry for Bakker in Blue Eye, Missouri, named Morningside. Production for The Jim Bakker Show moved to Morningside in 2008.

Prophecies and statements
In 2013, Bakker wrote Time Has Come: How to Prepare Now for Epic Events Ahead about end-time events. Bakker has changed his views on prosperity theology. In his 1980 book Eight Keys to Success, he stated, "God wants you to be happy, God wants you to be rich, God wants you to prosper." In his 1996 book, I Was Wrong, he admitted that the first time he actually read the Bible all the way through was in prison. Bakker also wrote that he realized that he had taken passages out of context and used them as prooftexts to support his prosperity theology.

Bakker's revived show features a number of ministers who bill themselves as "prophets". He now says that "PTL" stands for "Prophets Talking Loud".

In an October 2017 video, Bakker said that "God will punish those" who ridicule him; he has said that Hurricane Harvey was a judgment of God, and he blamed Hurricane Matthew on then-President Barack Obama. Bakker predicted that if then-President Donald Trump was impeached, Christians would begin a Second American Civil War. He compared the 2017 Washington train derailment to the sinking of the RMS Titanic and stated the Amtrak train derailment was a warning from God. He also claimed that he predicted the September 11 attacks of 2001, stating that he "saw 9/11 in 1999 before New Year's Eve" and that there would "be terrorism" and bombings in New York City and Washington, D.C." A few days after the Stoneman Douglas High School shooting, he stated that "God came to [him] in a dream... and he was wearing camouflage, a hunting vest and had an AR-15 strapped to his back" and that God supported Trump's plan to arm teachers. Following the death of Billy Graham on February 21, 2018, Bakker attended Graham's funeral and paid his respects, stating that Graham was the greatest preacher since Jesus, and also remarking that Graham had visited him in prison.

On the Stand in the Gap Today radio program, Pennsylvania Pastors Network president Sam Rohrer criticized Bakker's civil-war prediction. Christian Today criticized Bakker's show for preying on "the most vulnerable kinds of people" and claimed that it had "no place on our TV screens."

COVID-19 controversies

Bakker sold colloidal silver supplements that he advertised as a panacea. In March 2020, the office of the Attorney General of New York ordered Bakker to cease making false medicinal claims about his supplements' alleged ability to cure the 2019–2020 strains of coronavirus, and the Federal Trade Commission and the Food and Drug Administration also sent a warning letter to Bakker about his claims regarding the supplements and coronavirus.

Missouri attorney general Eric Schmitt and Arkansas attorney general Leslie Rutledge filed lawsuits against Bakker for allegedly pushing the supplements as a treatment for the virus. In the State lawsuit against him, Bakker is represented by former Missouri governor Jay Nixon, who has argued for the suit to be dismissed. Nixon says that the allegations made in the lawsuit are false, stating: "Bakker is being unfairly targeted by those who want to crush his ministry and force his Christian television program off the air."

In April 2020, prohibited from receiving credit card transactions, Bakker disclosed to his viewers that his ministry was on the brink of filing for bankruptcy and urgently petitioned them for donations.

The following month, GEB America and World Harvest Television dropped Bakker's program from their networks after DirecTV owner AT&T asked channels to reconsider airing the show. AT&T made the request of its channels in response to a deplatforming campaign from the liberal Christian group Faithful America.

On May 8, 2020, Lori Bakker announced that Jim Bakker had suffered a stroke that his son Jay described as “minor”. Lori stated that he would be taking a sabbatical from the program until he recovers. She blamed the stroke on Bakker's hard work on his show and wrote that he had described the criticism against him as “the most vicious attack that he has ever experienced”. Bakker returned to his program for the first time following his stroke on July 8, 2020.

On June 23, 2021, Missouri Attorney General Eric Schmitt announced the settlement of the state's lawsuit against Bakker.  Bakker and Morningside Church would be prohibited from saying silver solution could "diagnose, prevent, mitigate, treat, or cure any disease or illness". Restitution of about $157,000 would also be paid to those who bought silver solution between February 12, 2020, and March 10, 2020.

Works
Move That Mountain (1976), 
Eight Keys to Success (1980), 
I Was Wrong (1996), 
Prosperity and the Coming Apocalypse (1998), 
The Refuge: The Joy of Christian Community in a Torn-Apart World (2000), 
Time Has Come: How to Prepare Now for Epic Events Ahead (2014), 
You Can Make It: God's Faithfulness in Dark Times-Past, Present and Future (2021)

References

External links
Jim Bakker Show
PTL Television Network website

1940 births
Living people
20th-century American criminals
20th-century American male writers
20th-century American non-fiction writers
20th-century apocalypticists
20th-century evangelicals
21st-century American male writers
21st-century American non-fiction writers
21st-century apocalypticists
21st-century evangelicals
American Charismatics
American evangelicals
American male non-fiction writers
American members of the clergy convicted of crimes
American people convicted of fraud
American people convicted of tax crimes
American television evangelists
COVID-19 misinformation
Evangelical writers
Former Pentecostals
Members of the clergy convicted of fraud
North Central University alumni
People from Charlotte, North Carolina
People from Muskegon, Michigan
Protestant religious leaders convicted of crimes
Religious controversies in the United States
Sex scandals in the United States
Sexual abuse scandals in Protestantism
Wealth in the United States
Writers from North Carolina